The 2018 Nebraska gubernatorial election took place on November 6, 2018, to elect the Governor of Nebraska, concurrently with the election of Nebraska's Class I U.S. Senate seat, as well as other elections to the United States Senate in other states, elections to the United States House of Representatives, and various Nebraska and local elections.  Incumbent Republican Governor Pete Ricketts won re-election to a second term.

Republican primary

Candidates

Declared
 Krystal Gabel, writer, candidate for Metropolitan Utilities District in 2016 and candidate for Omaha City Council in 2017
 Pete Ricketts, incumbent governor
Running mate: Mike Foley, incumbent lieutenant governor

Declined
 Mike Flood, former Speaker of the Nebraska Legislature
 Bob Krist, state senator (running as a Democrat)

Endorsements

Results

Democratic primary

Candidates

Declared
 Tyler Davis, University of Nebraska, Omaha instructor
 Bob Krist, state senator
 Running Mate: Lynne Walz, state senator
 Vanessa Gayle Ward, activist

Declined
 Chuck Hassebrook, former Regent of the University of Nebraska and nominee for governor in 2014 (running for the legislature)
 Steve Lathrop, former state senator (running for the legislature)

Endorsements

Results

Independents
State Senator Bob Krist announced in September 2017 he left the Republican Party in order to mount a third party challenge against Governor Ricketts. Krist planned to create a new party in order to run, which will require submitting 5,000 signatures to qualify the party for the ballot. However, in February 2018 he abandoned the independent candidacy and became a Democrat.

Candidates

Withdrawn
 Bob Krist, state senator (running as a Democrat)

General election

Predictions

Debates

Results

See also
Nebraska elections, 2018

References

External links
 Candidates at Vote Smart 
 Candidates at Ballotpedia

Official campaign websites
 Bob Krist (D) for Governor
 Pete Ricketts (R) for Governor

Gubernatorial
2018
2018 United States gubernatorial elections
Ricketts family